Cyperus natalensis is a species of sedge that is native to south eastern parts of Africa.

See also 
 List of Cyperus species

References 

natalensis
Plants described in 1845
Flora of South Africa
Flora of Mozambique